Robert Smith (born January 16, 1974), is an American professional bowler known for his years on the Professional Bowlers Association (PBA) Tour. A native of Simi Valley, California, Smith has previously held residence in Captain Cook, Hawaii, Columbus, Ohio, and Hong Kong.  Currently, he resides and works near his home town in Ventura, California.

Smith's career on the PBA tour was marred by numerous injuries, resulting in many withdrawals from high-profile tournaments. Despite this, he amassed seven tour titles during his career, with his first being his lone major victory. In his prime, Smith was considered the world's most powerful one-handed bowler. This high rev-rate (from about 550-600 RPM on average and up to 720 RPM tops) is more than most bowlers have been able to produce. Based on this characteristic, he was known on tour as "Maximum Bob."

Career titles

Other achievements and recognition
 Smith won the USBC 1992 Chuck Hall Star of Tomorrow Award
 Became the youngest person to win the U.S. Amateur Championship - aged 19 - in 1993.
 Member of Team USA in 1994 and 1995.
 Named the first team Collegiate All-American at San Diego State University in 1993

Trivia
 In the 2000 U.S. Open, Robert Smith became the first player in the history of the sport to have won both U.S. Amateur and U.S. Open titles.
 Smith made at least one TV finals appearance in each of his first 12 full seasons on tour.
 He has 31 career 300 games in PBA competition.
 Smith bowls league at Buena Lanes in Ventura, California where he shot back to back 300 games in 2019 with a plastic bowling ball.

References

External links
Robert Smith's PBA profile

American ten-pin bowling players
People from Simi Valley, California
1974 births
Living people
Sportspeople from Ventura County, California